Victor Brooks is the name of

 Victor Brooks (actor) (1918–2000), English actor
 Victor Brooks (athlete) (born 1941), Jamaican long jumper